Ashley Weinhold and Caitlin Whoriskey were the defending champions and successfully defended their title, defeating Jamie Loeb and Chanel Simmonds in the final, 6–4, 6–4.

Seeds

Draw

References 
 Draw

FSP Gold River Women's Challenger - Doubles
FSP Gold River Women's Challenger